Koriri Teaiwa Tenieu is a former I-Kiribati politician. She was a member of Parliament for Tabiteuea North during the fifth Parliament of Kiribati. She was the third woman to be elected to the House of Assembly, after Tekarei Russell in 1974 and Fenua Tamuera in 1990. During the 1991 Kiribati parliamentary election, Koriri Tenieu's husband, Teaiwa Tenieu, was found guilty of bribery, and his election was voided. A by-election was held, in which Koriri Tenieu stood and was elected. This election was then also declared void, as Teaiwa had been found to have bribed people and organisations in support of his wife.

References

Bibliography
 

Living people
Members of the House of Assembly (Kiribati)
Year of birth unknown
20th-century I-Kiribati politicians
20th-century I-Kiribati women politicians
Year of birth missing (living people)